Iphigénie was a 32-gun Iphigénie-class frigate of the French Navy, and the lead ship of her class. She was briefly in British hands after the Anglo-Spanish capture of Toulon in August 1793 but the French recaptured her December. The Spanish captured her in 1795 and her subsequent fate is unknown.

Career

On 10 July 1777 Iphigénie, Captain Kersaint de Coëtnempren was part of the French fleet, under Louis Guillouet, comte d'Orvilliers. The fleet was in a fog and when the fog lifted, the French realised that a British vessel was among them. The French cutter Curieuse, of 10 guns and under the command of Captain Trolong du Rumain, chased   and ordered her to lie to, which order Biggs declined. However, Iphigénie came up and ordered Biggs to sail Lively to the French admiral. Biggs was still arguing when Iphigénie fired a broadside. The broadside killed 12 British sailors; thereupon, Biggs struck. The French took Lively into service.

Between June and July 1778, Iphigénie was at Brest, being coppered. One year later Iphigénie took part in the Battle of Grenada.

The frigates belonged to Guichen's squadron.

In January–February 1782, French captain Armand de Kersaint led a squadron in Iphigénie that included two more frigates, four brigs, and a large cutter to recapture Demerara and Essequibo. The naval opposition consisted of a  British squadron of three sloops and two brig sloops under the command of Commander William Tarhoudin in HMS Oronoque. The French were sighted on 30 January and Tarhoudin moved his squadron downriver. However, the French landed troops and as these moved towards Demerara, the British forces facing them retreated, forcing Tarhoudin to pull back his vessels also. On 1 February the British asked for terms of capitulation, with the actual capitulation taking place on 3 February.

Between November 1783 and January 1784, Iphigénie underwent repair and refitting at Martinique.

In August 1793 the British captured her at Toulon. In September they added mortars to her armament. When they left Toulon she was in the harbour awaiting repairs. They set fire to her, or at least believed that they had. However, the French returned her to service. Between January 1794 and May she underwent refitting and repair.

Fate

On 14 February 1795, she was captured in the Gulf of Roses by a Spanish fleet under Admiral Juan de Lángara. The Spanish sailed her to Cartagena and brought into the Spanish Armada as Ifigenia.

Notes, citations, and references 
Notes

Citations

Bibliography
 

  (1671-1870)

Iphigénie-class frigates
1777 ships
Ships built in France
Age of Sail frigates of France
Age of Sail ships of Spain
Captured ships